Meribah is a small settlement in the Brown's Well district of the Murray Mallee region of South Australia, not far from the border with Victoria. It was the original terminus of the Barmera railway line from May 7, 1913, until the line was extended to Paringa later the same year. It is about 70 km north of Pinnaroo and 45 km southeast of Loxton.

The town was surveyed in July 1914 and named for a Biblical place where Moses struck the rocks causing water to gush forth.

The post office opened in March 1916 and closed in June 1985.

References

Towns in South Australia